In Greek mythology, Nisos or Nisus (Ancient Greek: Νῖσος) was a King of Megara.

Family 
Nisos was one of the four sons of Pandion II, King of Athens, and Pylia, daughter of King Pylas of Megara. He was the brother of Aegeas, Pallas, Lykos and the wife of Sciron. According to Hyginus, Nisus's father was the god Ares while other authors affirmed that he was the offspring of Deion.

Nisos was married to Abrota, sister of Megareus, and when she died, Nisos commanded that the Megarian women should wear clothes like she had. His daughter Eurynome, with Poseidon, had the famous son Bellerophon. The second daughter Iphinoe married Megareus, her maternal uncle. Lastly, the third princess Scylla was responsible for Nisos' death.

Mythology

Early days 
Metion, the uncle of Nisos, had seized the throne from Pandion II. However, upon their father's death, Nisos and his brothers returned to Athens and took back control. They drove out the sons of Metion, put Aegeus on the throne, and divided the government in four. Aegeas became king of Athens, and Nisos the King of Megara.

War with Minos 
Minos, King of Crete, attacked Nisos's kingdom during a war with Athens over the death of his son Androgeus. Nisos however had a lock of purple hair that kept him safe from harm. Eros caused his daughter Scylla to fall in love with Minos. In one version, Minos tempts Scylla with a golden necklace to betray and kill her father. In another version, she fell in love with Minos from a distance, and after cutting off the purple lock, she presented it to Minos. However, Minos was disgusted with her act, calling her a disgrace. As Minos's ships set sail, Scylla attempted to climb up one of them. But Nisos, who had turned into a sea eagle or osprey, attacked her. His daughter transformed into a bird as well. There is also a version with Ares. According to another account Nisos killed himself when he lost his vital lock of hair.

See also
 Byzas

Notes

References 

 Aeschylus, translated in two volumes. 2. Libation Bearers by Herbert Weir Smyth, Ph. D. Cambridge, MA. Harvard University Press. 1926. Online version at the Perseus Digital Library. Greek text available from the same website.
 Apollodorus, The Library with an English Translation by Sir James George Frazer, F.B.A., F.R.S. in 2 Volumes, Cambridge, MA, Harvard University Press; London, William Heinemann Ltd. 1921. . Online version at the Perseus Digital Library. Greek text available from the same website.
Gaius Julius Hyginus, Fabulae from The Myths of Hyginus translated and edited by Mary Grant. University of Kansas Publications in Humanistic Studies. Online version at the Topos Text Project.
 Hesiod, Catalogue of Women from Homeric Hymns, Epic Cycle, Homerica translated by Evelyn-White, H G. Loeb Classical Library Volume 57. London: William Heinemann, 1914. Online version at theio.com
 Homer, The Odyssey with an English Translation by A.T. Murray, PH.D. in two volumes. Cambridge, MA., Harvard University Press; London, William Heinemann, Ltd. 1919. . Online version at the Perseus Digital Library. Greek text available from the same website.
 Nonnus of Panopolis, Dionysiaca translated by William Henry Denham Rouse (1863-1950), from the Loeb Classical Library, Cambridge, MA, Harvard University Press, 1940.  Online version at the Topos Text Project.
 Nonnus of Panopolis, Dionysiaca. 3 Vols. W.H.D. Rouse. Cambridge, MA., Harvard University Press; London, William Heinemann, Ltd. 1940-1942. Greek text available at the Perseus Digital Library.
 Pausanias, Description of Greece with an English Translation by W.H.S. Jones, Litt.D., and H.A. Ormerod, M.A., in 4 Volumes. Cambridge, MA, Harvard University Press; London, William Heinemann Ltd. 1918. . Online version at the Perseus Digital Library
 Pausanias, Graeciae Descriptio. 3 vols. Leipzig, Teubner. 1903.  Greek text available at the Perseus Digital Library.
 Publius Ovidius Naso, Metamorphoses translated by Brookes More (1859-1942). Boston, Cornhill Publishing Co. 1922. Online version at the Perseus Digital Library.
 Publius Ovidius Naso, Metamorphoses. Hugo Magnus. Gotha (Germany). Friedr. Andr. Perthes. 1892. Latin text available at the Perseus Digital Library.

Kings of Athens
Kings in Greek mythology
Children of Ares
Metamorphoses into birds in Greek mythology
Megarian characters in Greek mythology
Suicides in Greek mythology
Attic mythology